Ormiston has been one of the ten district electoral areas (DEA) in Belfast, Northern Ireland since 2014. Located in the east of the city, the district elects seven members to Belfast City Council and contains the wards of Belmont, Garnerville, Gilnahirk, Sandown, Shandon, Knock and Stormont. Ormiston, along with wards from the neighbouring Titanic and Lisnasharragh DEAs, together with parts of Lisburn and Castlereagh District Council, form the Belfast East constituency for the Northern Ireland Assembly and UK Parliament.

The district was created for the 2014 local elections, replacing the Victoria District Electoral Area,  which had existed since 1985. Nineteen candidates contested the first election in 2014, the most of any DEA in Northern Ireland.

Councillors

2023 Elections 
2019: 3 x Alliance, 2 x DUP, 1 x UUP, 1 x Green

2023:

2019-2023 Change:

2019 Elections
2014: 2 x Alliance, 2 x DUP, 2 x UUP, 1 x Green

2019: 3 x Alliance, 2 x DUP, 1 x UUP, 1 x Green

2014-2019 Change: Alliance gain from UUP

2014 Elections

References

Electoral wards of Belfast
2014 establishments in Northern Ireland